Namoni Majuli (also called Lower Majuli) is the lower part of Majuli, Jorhat, Assam. It starts from Kamalabari to lower most Ahotguri mouza. But years ago this mouza has been vanished due to severe flood erosion of Brahmaputra river.

See also
Madhya Majuli
Ujoni Majuli
List of educational institutes in Majuli
List of villages in Majuli

External links

Geography of Assam
Majuli
Majuli district